Shamshad known by her alias Yasmeen Khan (1950, Peshawar – 15 April 1999, Peshawar) was a Pakistani actress. She was a popular actress who starred in many Pashto films. She was murdered on 15 April 1999.

Personal life 
Yasmeen was born as Shamshad in Kakshal, Peshawar in 1950 to Moeen Khan and Syed Bibi. In the 1960s, her family moved to Karachi where she was able to take up a role in her career's first film. Soon Yasmeen's popularity grew in films and she became a well known actress.

Yasmeen married her fellow actor Saqi and had a daughter with him. Her second marriage was to Malik Bari, the owner of Bari Studios, Lahore which however, did not last long. This union did produce another daughter, Qara-tul-Aeen. Her third marriage was with Arifullah, a business owner in Shoba Bazar, Peshawar.

Career 
Yasmeen Khan's career was launched when she played a lead role in the first Pashto movie to become a hit; Yousaf Khan Sherbano released in December 1970. Yasmeen acted with the Pashto actor Badar Munir and the pair became icon of Pashtun films. She acted in more than 80 pashto movies along with Badar Munir and 200 movies in her total career. Yasmeen Khan's first Urdu film, Dulhan Ek Raat Ki was released in 1975. The film's dance number Aaja aaja karle pyar, kehti hai suhani shaam brought much fame to Yasmeen Khan and soon she also started acting in Punjabi films like Hathkari (1976).In 1995, Yasmeen launched her film direction and production but due to little success in it, she left the work.  After her third marriage, Yasmeen Khan distanced herself from the film industry because she felt that the industry was becoming vulgar and did not focus on Pashtun culture. Yasmeen withdrew herself from showbiz and turned towards religion. She tried to lead her husband, Arifullah; who was deep into gambling, to correct his ways but Yasmeen's efforts made him furious and he ended up killing her.

Death 
Khan was asleep when she was shot in her head by her husband, Arifullah and her room's door was locked. Her daughter Qara-Tul-Aeen discovered her mother's dead body and reported the incident to the police. Arifullah was held suspect in her death but released after few months from Peshawar jail. Arifullah was later murdered.

Filmography 

 Dehqan
 Yousaf Khan Sherbano (1970)
 Dulhan Aik Raat ki
 Adam Khan Durkhaniye (1971)
 Orbal- 1973
 Mitti Ke Putlay (1974)
 Mah Jabeen- 1972
 Jehan Barf Girti Hay- 1972
 Dil Walay- 1974
 Dosti Te Dushmanee- 1977
 Dameena Dameena - 1977

References 

1950 births
1999 deaths
20th-century Pakistani actresses
Pakistani film actresses
People from Khyber Pakhtunkhwa
People from Peshawar
Actresses in Urdu cinema
Actresses in Pashto cinema
Actresses in Punjabi cinema